Parliamentary elections were held in Colombia on 26 February 1978 to elect the Senate and Chamber of Representatives. The result was a victory for the Liberal Party, which won 111 of the 199 Chamber seats and 62 of the 112 Senate seats.

Results

Senate

Chamber of Representatives

Within Liberal ranks, lists supporting presidential pre-candidate Julio César Turbay Ayala soundly defeated lists supporting his rival for the party's nomination, former President Carlos Lleras Restrepo. Unofficial results showed about 1,441,000 votes for pro-Turbay Liberal lists and 673,000 votes for pro-Lleras Liberals. This victory confirmed Turbay's candidacy as the official Liberal candidate for the June presidential election, in which he defeated Conservative candidate Belisario Betancur.

References

Parliamentary elections in Colombia
Colombia
1978 in Colombia
Election and referendum articles with incomplete results